This is a list of the Australian moth species of the family Galacticidae. It also acts as an index to the species articles and forms part of the full List of moths of Australia.

Homadaula coscinopa Lower, 1900
Homadaula lasiochroa Lower, 1899
Homadaula myriospila Meyrick, 1907
Homadaula poliodes Meyrick, 1907
Tanaoctena ooptila Turner, 1913
Tanaoctena pygmaeodes (Turner, 1926)

External links 
Galacticidae at Australian Faunal Directory

Australia
Galacticidae